The Chinkees Are Coming (also known as ...Are Coming) is the first studio album by the all-Asian ska punk band the Chinkees. Released in 1998 on Asian Man Records, it was the first of three studio albums by the band. Some of the album's proceeds went to anti-racist organizations.

Critical reception
AllMusic wrote that "the message of harmony makes The Chinkees Are Coming! a pleasing listen for 2-Tone fans who miss ska's more political aspects in the late-'90s third wave revival."

Track listing
All tracks written by Mike Park, except where noted.

References

1998 albums
Third wave ska albums
The Chinkees albums
Asian Man Records albums